The NATPE Iris Awards are an honor for local television programming excellence presented annually in the United States by the National Association of Television Program Executives (NATPE). The awards were introduced in 1968 and were initially titled the Program Excellence Awards, but were renamed in 1977. The Iris Awards are the only national award meant to honor quality local television programming. From 1968 to 1997, the awards were presented at the annual NATPE Conference and Exhibition. After 1997, the awards were presented at a special ceremony in Los Angeles, California.
NATPE’s Iris Awards were created to recognize best-in-class executives, program producers, creators, talent and importantly content that makes a significant impact on the industry and culture.

See also
 List of American television awards

References

Awards established in 1968
American television awards
1968 establishments in the United States